Opisthotropis maxwelli, Maxwell's mountain keelback,  is a species of natricine snake found in China.

References

Opisthotropis
Reptiles described in 1914
Reptiles of China
Taxa named by George Albert Boulenger